The forest scrub robin (Cercotrichas leucosticta) is a species of bird in the family Muscicapidae. It is disjunctly present throughout the African tropical rainforest :
 C. l. colstoni Tye, 1991 — Sierra Leone, Liberia and Ivory Coast		
 C. l. leucosticta	(Sharpe, 1883) — Ghana		
 C. l. collsi (Alexander, 1907) — se Central African Republic, ne DR Congo and w Uganda		
 C. l. reichenowi (Hartert, 1907) — western Angola

References

forest scrub robin
Birds of the African tropical rainforest
forest scrub robin
Taxonomy articles created by Polbot
Taxobox binomials not recognized by IUCN